Noteridae is a family of adephagan water beetles closely related to the Dytiscidae, and formerly classified with them. They are mainly distinguished by the presence of a distinctive "noterid platform" underneath, in the form of a plate between the second and third pair of legs. The family consists of about 230 species in 14 genera, and is found worldwide, more commonly in the tropics. They are sometimes referred to as burrowing water beetles.

These beetles are relatively small, ranging from 1 to 6 mm, with smooth oval bodies ranging from light brown to a darker reddish brown. The head is short and somewhat covered by the prothorax.

Both adults and larvae are aquatic, and are commonly found around plants. They have a habit of burrowing through pond and marsh substrate, thus the common name, and are primarily carnivorous, with some scavenging observed.

Genera
Noteridae contains the following genera:

 Canthydrus Sharp, 1882
 Hydrocanthus Say, 1823
 Mesonoterus Sharp, 1882
 Neohydrocoptus Satô, 1972
 Noterus Clairville, 1806
 Notomicrus Sharp, 1882
 Phreatodytes Uéno, 1957
 Pronoterus Sharp, 1882
 Renotus Guignot, 1936
 Siolius J.Balfour-Browne, 1969
 Speonoterus Spangler, 1996
 Suphis Aubé, 1836
 Suphisellus Crotch, 1873
 Synchortus Sharp, 1882

References
 Nilsson, Anders N. (2006). “A World Catalogue of the Family Noteridae, or the Burrowing Water Beetles (Coleoptera, Adephaga).” University of Umea, Sweden. Retrieved on 10 May 2012.
 R. E. Roughley, "Noteridae", in Ross H. Arnett, Jr. and Michael C. Thomas, American Beetles (CRC Press, 2001), vol. 1

External links
 Noterid info at UIUC

 
Beetle families